Paul Richard Mara (born September 7, 1979) is an American former professional ice hockey defender, and current head coach of the Boston Pride in the PHF (formerly NWHL).

He was selected 7th overall by the Tampa Bay Lightning in the 1997 NHL Entry Draft, and went on to play 12 seasons in the National Hockey League.

Playing career

Amateur
As a youth, Mara played in the 1993 Quebec International Pee-Wee Hockey Tournament with a minor ice hockey team from the South Shore.

After playing two seasons of high school level hockey in Massachusetts for Belmont Hill School Paul Mara joined the Sudbury Wolves of the Ontario Hockey League for the 1996–97 season. As part of a three team trade with the Windsor Spitfires Mara was traded to the Plymouth Whalers on December 16, 1997. In reflecting on his move from high school to Junior hockey Mara said, "It was the best decision of my life, to go up to Sudbury."

Professional
Mara was drafted in the first round, 7th overall, in the 1997 NHL Entry Draft by the Tampa Bay Lightning. He spent two seasons between the Lightning and their IHL affiliate team the Detroit Vipers before being traded to the Phoenix Coyotes in 2001. He played 81 games with the Coyotes in 2003-04. During the 2004 NHL lockout, Mara joined the Hannover Scorpions of the Deutsche Eishockey Liga.

After the lockout, Paul Mara scored a career high 47 points that year. On June 26, 2006, he was traded by the Coyotes to the Boston Bruins for fellow defenseman Nick Boynton.

On February 27, 2007, Mara was traded to the New York Rangers for Aaron Ward. On July 4, 2008, Mara re-signed with the Rangers for one year at $1.95 million.

On July 10, 2009, Mara signed with the Montreal Canadiens.

On September 16, 2010, Mara signed with the Anaheim Ducks for one year at $750,000. After appearing in 33 games with the Ducks to start the 2010–11 season, on February 16, 2011, Mara was traded by the Ducks to the Montreal Canadiens in exchange for a 2012 5th round draft pick. He took a brief break from hockey during the 2011-12 season.

On September 26, 2012, Mara signed a one-year contract with the Ontario Reign of the ECHL.

On January 9, 2013, Mara signed with the Houston Aeros after the team became short on defensemen due to a combination of injuries and the end of the NHL lockout.

Coaching career
Mara was the assistant coach of the 2018 Olympic United States women's national ice hockey team. On May 30, 2018, Mara was named head coach of the PHF's (formerly NWHL) Boston Pride. He is currently the head coach with the most wins in PHF history, and one of only two coaches to win more than 30 games. Mara became the first coach in PHF history to win 50 games in November 2022.

Personal life 
Mara was born in Ridgewood, New Jersey and despite his birthplace, he is of no relation to the family of Wellington Mara, who were known for their ownership of the NFL's New York Giants. Mara was raised in Belmont, Massachusetts.

His older brother, Rob Mara, was drafted by the Chicago Blackhawks in eleventh round of the 1994 NHL Entry Draft.

International play
Mara was a member of the 1996–97, 1997–98, and 1998–99 United States World Junior Championship teams. He also played for the United States at the 2004 World Championships in Prague, Czech Republic.

Career statistics

Regular season and playoffs

International

References

External links

1979 births
Living people
American men's ice hockey defensemen
Anaheim Ducks players
Boston Bruins players
Detroit Vipers players
Hannover Scorpions players
Houston Aeros (1994–2013) players
Ice hockey coaches from Massachusetts
Ice hockey coaches from New Jersey
Montreal Canadiens players
National Hockey League first-round draft picks
New York Rangers players
Ontario Reign (ECHL) players
People from Belmont, Massachusetts
People from Ridgewood, New Jersey
Phoenix Coyotes players
Plymouth Whalers players
Sportspeople from Bergen County, New Jersey
Sportspeople from Middlesex County, Massachusetts
Sudbury Wolves players
Tampa Bay Lightning draft picks
Tampa Bay Lightning players
Belmont Hill School alumni
Premier Hockey Federation coaches
Ice hockey players from New Jersey
Ice hockey players from Massachusetts